Alexander Calvert is a Canadian actor, best known for playing the role of Jack Kline on the CW show Supernatural.

Early life
A native of Vancouver, Calvert studied musical theatre and hip hop dancing until the age of 15, when he became interested in acting.

Career
He has appeared in several films and television series, including the Nickelodeon series The Troop, To Be Fat like Me, and The Dead Zone, and was young Justin in Kickin' It Old Skool. On July 17, 2015, it was announced that Calvert was cast as Lonnie Machin for season 4 of the CW's Arrow.

In 2017, Calvert was cast as Jack, the son of Lucifer in Supernatural. He debuted in the season 12 finale, and has since been a regular cast member for seasons 13, 14 and 15.

Filmography

Film

Television

References

External links
 
 

Living people
Canadian male film actors
Canadian male television actors
Male actors from Vancouver
1990 births